Gebildbrot is a bread or pastry in forms of figurative representations, such as a human, hare, bird or other braidings of dough. Traditionally this pastry is made for and consumed on certain feasts of the liturgical year.

History 
In early forms of funeral feasts, spiced breads were eaten at funerals to ward off evil spirits.

The term Gebildbrot (from the German word for "shaped bread") was used first by the German historian and folklorist Ernst Ludwig Rochholz (1809-1892). The German Folklore Dictionary, published in 1974, is already critical of such opinions of the “popular mythologists of the 19th century”, although it gives a detailed account of them. Rather, one should reckon with the "personal drive to sculpt the manufacturer and with baker's whims" or the requirements of the baking process (perforation, splitting).

Most common pastries are made from yeast dough, which has been traceable since the 15th century. Around 1700 there were yeast cultivations, which were primarily aimed at the needs of beer brewers and schnapps distillers and were not very suitable for bakers. It was not until the 19th century that new brewery technologies made sufficient baker's yeast available. From this alone, the pre-Christian cultic theories lead ad absurdum.

Well-known Gebildbrote 

 pretzels (which were originally as a pastry made for lenten seasons)
 yeast braids
 Aachener Printen
 gingerbread in form of hearts, stars, sun, moon, also 
 gingerbread men for various feasts, for example St. John's bread, "Klausenmann" for Saint Nicholas Day
 Speculaas is one of the most popular forms of Gebildbrot. These flat biscuits of seasoned shortcrust pastry are traditionally made around Saint Nicholas' day in the Netherlands, Belgium, Luxembourg, and around Christmas in Germany and Austria.
 Saint Agatha's bread for Saint Agatha's day on 5 February. While Saint Agatha's breads (or buns) are usually made in Germany, in Italy, especially in Sicily, special sweets in the form of breasts are common, called Minni de virgine or Minne di Sant’Agata ("Saint Agatha's breasts"). St. Agatha's bread is usually blessed by a priest or a deacon in the bakery, prior to be sold.
 various Easter breads
 Easter lamb with flag
 various pastry in the form of birds for the Feast of the Ascension
 in Sweden saffron buns in various forms, known as Lussekatter, are made for Saint Lucy's Day
 So-called Hedwigssohlen (shoe soles of St. Hedwig) are made in some regions on the occasion of Saint Hedwig of Silesia's feast. The pastry originates from the Saint's habit to walk barefoot and wear the shoes in her hand, since her confessor ordered her to "wear shoes".

References

Ginger dishes
Cookies
German cuisine
Italian cuisine
Swedish cuisine
Religious food and drink